Pich Kuh (also Romanized as Pīch Kūh; also known as Pīch Kūh-e ‘Olyā) is a village in Kuhestan Rural District, Rostaq District, Darab County, Fars Province, Iran. At the 2006 census, its population was 25, in 6 families.

References 

Populated places in Darab County